Raccoon Island is an island in the Hingham Bay area of the Boston Harbor Islands National Recreation Area, situated just offshore of Hough's Neck in the city of Quincy. The island is characterized by gravel beaches and rocky slopes. While it is possible to walk to the island at low tide, public access is discouraged.

References

Boston Harbor islands
Quincy, Massachusetts
Coastal islands of Massachusetts
Islands of Norfolk County, Massachusetts